This is a list of singles that have peaked in the Top 10 of the Billboard Hot 100 during 1983.

Michael Jackson scored seven top ten hits during the year with "The Girl Is Mine", "Billie Jean", "Beat It", "Wanna Be Startin' Somethin'", "Human Nature", "Say Say Say", and "P.Y.T. (Pretty Young Thing)", the most among all other artists.

Top-ten singles

1982 peaks

1984 peaks

See also
 1983 in music
 List of Hot 100 number-one singles of 1983 (U.S.)
 Billboard Year-End Hot 100 singles of 1983

References

General sources

Joel Whitburn Presents the Billboard Hot 100 Charts: The Eighties
Additional information obtained can be verified within Billboard's online archive services and print editions of the magazine.

1983
United States Hot 100 Top 10